Barrabás  was a weekly graphical humor and political satirical magazine focusing on football news published in Barcelona between 1972 and 1977.

History and profile
Barrabás was launched in Barcelona on 3 October 1972 as a weekly. The magazine was established by Josep Llario who also started other titles such as Por Favor and Interviú. Its founding publisher was Elf Ediciones which also produced El Papus. The company was part of the La Vanguardia Española group headed by Javier Godó Muntañola. From the issue 124 the publisher became the TISA company.

The magazine like other satirical titles of the period presented news on current events through cartoons, and its focus was on football. Major cartoonists included Ivà (Ramón Tosas) and Óscar Nebreda. The circulation of Barrabás was nearly 113,450 copies from February 1973.

The magazine began to decline in August 1976 and folded in July 1977.

References

External links

1972 establishments in Spain
1977 disestablishments in Spain
Defunct magazines published in Spain
Francoist Spain
Magazines established in 1972
Magazines disestablished in 1977
Magazines published in Barcelona
Satirical magazines published in Spain
Spanish humour
Spanish-language magazines
Spanish political satire
Weekly magazines published in Spain
Association football magazines
Football mass media in Spain
Humor magazines